Robert David Smith (born February 12, 1958) is a Canadian professional ice hockey executive and former player. Smith was the majority owner of the Halifax Mooseheads junior hockey team for twenty years until February 2023. He played for the Minnesota North Stars and Montreal Canadiens in the National Hockey League (NHL). He played in four Stanley Cup Finals and won the 1986 Stanley Cup with the Canadiens. Smith was born in North Sydney, Nova Scotia, but grew up in Ottawa, Ontario.

Playing career
As a junior playing for the Ottawa 67's in the Ontario Major Junior Hockey League (OMJHL) in the 1977–78 season, Smith set league records that still stand more than thirty years later for most assists (123) and most points (192) in a single season. The 20 year old Smith beat out 17 year old Wayne Gretzky (182 points) for that year's OMJHL scoring title, while also winning the Red Tilson Trophy as the OMJHL's most outstanding player and was voted the CHL Player of the Year for the entire Canadian Hockey League. He was drafted first overall in the 1978 NHL Amateur Draft by Minnesota, winning the Calder Memorial Trophy in 1979 during his rookie campaign and won the Stanley Cup in 1986 with Montreal.

Smith was formerly the majority owner of the Halifax Mooseheads in the Quebec Major Junior Hockey League, also serving as head coach for most of the 2010–11 season. He also served as general manager of the NHL's Phoenix Coyotes from 1996 to 2000.

Achievements and awards
OHL Second All Star Team (1976, 1977)
Memorial Cup All Star Team (1977)
George Parsons Trophy (1977)
OHL Most Valuable Player (1978)
OHL First All Star Team (1978)
OHL Record for Most Assists (123) in a Single Season (1977–78)
OHL Record for Most Points (192) in a Single Season (1977–78)
OHL Record for Most Power-Play Goals (5) in One Game
CHL Player of the Year (1978)
NHL Calder Memorial Trophy (1979)
NHL Stanley Cup Championship (1986)
NHL All Star (1981, 1982, 1989, 1991)

Career statistics

Regular season and playoffs

International

See also
List of NHL players with 1,000 games played
List of NHL players with 1,000 points

External links 
 

1958 births
Arizona Coyotes executives
Calder Trophy winners
Canadian ice hockey centres
Halifax Mooseheads coaches
Ice hockey people from Nova Scotia
Ice hockey people from Ottawa
Living people
Minnesota North Stars draft picks
Minnesota North Stars players
Montreal Canadiens players
National Hockey League All-Stars
National Hockey League first-overall draft picks
National Hockey League first-round draft picks
Ottawa 67's players
People from North Sydney, Nova Scotia
Stanley Cup champions
Canadian ice hockey coaches